Deuxième vie (French for "Second Life") is a 2000 French comedy and fantasy film directed by Patrick Braoudé. It stars the same Braoudé and focuses on time travel. It is set during the period of the football World Cups of 1982 and 1998.

The shooting took place in Paris and Morocco and it was also operated under the titles Le 11e commandement (The 11th  Commandment) and Mon futur et moi (My Future and Me).

Plot
8 July 1982. In World Cup semifinal France was beaten by West Germany in penalty kicks, after leading 3-1 in extra time: It is a national tragedy.

Vincent (Patrick Braoudé), 30 years old, is an immature man. When Laurie (Maria de Medeiros), the woman he loves, asks Vincent to create a family, he is unable to make a decision. He also feels difficult to decide upon resumption of the family business, the association with Forsan (Thierry Lhermitte), his childhood friend, or simply to purchase a single pair of shoes. The same evening he is the victim of a car accident that catapults him 16 years later, on July 12, 1998. It is the night of the French victory of the 1998 World Cup against Brazil: thousands of French are celebrating the victory in Paris at the Eiffel Tower and Vincent is mistaken for a Brazilian and after for a fool, asking why they were celebrating a defeat.

Vincent has also some difficulty mastering that Jacques Chirac is the French president and cybercafés are trendy. His father (Wojciech Pszoniak) sold the family store against a pizzeria and Ronny (Daniel Russo) became their driver. Vincent also has difficulty when he discovers himself married with Sonia (Isabelle Candelier), father and CEO capitalist, greedy and ignoble. His son Cédric (Jimmy Redler) feels a boundless hatred to him and Vincent remains troubled by the beauty of his daughter Marina (Anne Abel). Shocked to have realized that he had become everything he hated in 1982 and having lost all his friends and Laurie, Vincent will try everything to go back in time and change his life, to delete this disastrous future.

Cast

 Patrick Braoudé as Vincent
 Maria de Medeiros as Laurie
 Isabelle Candelier as Sonia
 Daniel Russo as Ronny
 Gad Elmaleh as Lionel
 Élie Semoun as Steve Michaud
 Thierry Lhermitte as Forsan
 Sonia Vollereaux as Carole
 Wojciech Pszoniak as Vincent's father
 Ginette Garcin as Henriette
 Anne Abel as Marina
 Jimmy Redler as Cédric
 Dout as the policeman #1 
 Philippe Lelièvre as the policeman #2 
 Rémy Roubakha as the Jewish man
 Frédérique Bel as the friend of Vincent's father
 Julie Dray as Sylvie, the secretary
 Malik Zidi as the waiter of the cybercafé
 Guila Braoudé as Sarah
 Christophe Landeau as the man in telephone booth

See also

Time travel in fiction
List of French films of 2000

References

External links

 Deuxième vie on "DeVilDead"

2000 films
2000s fantasy comedy films
French fantasy comedy films
Films about time travel
French association football films
2000s French-language films
Films set in Paris
Films directed by Patrick Braoudé
2000 comedy films
2000s French films